The 16th Aviation Brigade  (16 Avn Bde) commands all the Australian Army aviation units and has technical control of the Army Aviation Training Centre reporting to Army Aviation Command. The Brigade was formed on 2 April 2002 by combining Headquarters Divisional Aviation (Operational Command) and Headquarters Aviation Support Group (Technical Command) and is headquartered in Enoggera Barracks, Queensland. It was originally named Headquarters 16th Brigade (Aviation) and was renamed to the 16th Aviation Brigade.

The Army Aviation Training Centre (AAvnTC) based at Oakey is responsible for training and maintains a training fleet reporting separately to Army Aviation Command.

Current structure
The 16th Aviation Brigade currently consists of:
16th Aviation Brigade headquarters (Enoggera Barracks, Brisbane, Queensland)
1st Aviation Regiment (armed reconnaissance helicopter, Robertson Barracks, Darwin, Northern Territory)
161st Reconnaissance Squadron
162nd Reconnaissance Squadron
Logistic Support Squadron
Technical Support Squadron
5th Aviation Regiment (transport helicopter, RAAF Base Townsville, Townsville, Queensland)
A Squadron
B Squadron
C Squadron
Logistic Support Squadron
Technical Support Squadron
6th Aviation Regiment (special forces transport helicopter, Holsworthy Barracks, Sydney, New South Wales)
171st Special Operations Aviation Squadron
173rd Aviation Squadron
Support Squadron

Equipment

References

Further reading

Brigades of Australia
Aviation units and formations of the Australian Army
Military units and formations established in 2002
2002 establishments in Australia
Army aviation brigades
Military units in Queensland